Meadow (also known as Peacock's Crossroads) is an unincorporated community in Johnston County, North Carolina, United States, situated at the intersection of North Carolina Highway 96 and North Carolina Highway 50.  It lies at an elevation of 200 feet (61 m).

History 
It was the home of John William Wood Sr. who owned and donated the land in Peacocks Crossroads on which Meadow School was built.

References

Unincorporated communities in Johnston County, North Carolina
Unincorporated communities in North Carolina